Ronald Gilchrist Brebner (23 September 1881 – 11 November 1914) was an English amateur footballer who competed in the 1912 Summer Olympics in Stockholm, Sweden.

Brebner was born in Darlington. He was the goalkeeper of the English team, which won the gold medal in the football tournament. He played all three matches.

He died young as a result of a football injury. He sustained head injuries whilst guarding the Leicester Fosse goal. He had two spells at Chelsea, and also played club football for Stockton & the Northern Nomads amateur teams as well as for Huddersfield Town.

References
General
 
 
Specific

1881 births
1914 deaths
Footballers from Darlington
English footballers
English Olympic medallists
England amateur international footballers
Association football goalkeepers
Footballers at the 1912 Summer Olympics
Olympic footballers of Great Britain
Olympic gold medallists for Great Britain
English Football League players
Huddersfield Town A.F.C. players
Northern Nomads F.C. players
London Caledonians F.C. players
Elgin City F.C. players
Sunderland A.F.C. players
Chelsea F.C. players
Darlington F.C. players
Leicester City F.C. players
Olympic medalists in football
Medalists at the 1912 Summer Olympics
Medalists at the 1908 Summer Olympics
Footballers at the 1908 Summer Olympics
Association football players who died while playing
Sport deaths in England